Hyman "Hymie" Miller (April 20, 1911 – October 1977) was an American boxer who competed in the 1928 Summer Olympics.

He was born in Pittsburgh, Pennsylvania and died in Rochester, New York.

In 1928, he was controversially eliminated in the first round of the flyweight class after losing a decision to Marcel Sartos of Belgium. In response, the American team threatened to withdraw from the competition.

1928 Olympic results
Below is the record of Hyman Miller, an American flyweight boxer who competed at the 1928 AMsterdam Olympics:

 Round of 32: lost to Marcel Sartos (Belgium) by decision

References

External links
profile

1911 births
1977 deaths
Boxers from Pittsburgh
Flyweight boxers
Olympic boxers of the United States
Boxers at the 1928 Summer Olympics
American male boxers